Blue Seven is a studio album by organist Shirley Scott recorded in 1961 for Prestige and issued in 1966 as PRLP 7376. It features performances by Oliver Nelson and Joe Newman, among the others.

Track listing 
"Blue Seven" (Sonny Rollins) – 6:45
"Don't Worry About It Baby, Here I Am" (Scott) – 6:40
"Nancy (With the Laughing Face)" (Phil Silvers, Jimmy Van Heusen) – 5:28
"Wagon Wheels" (DeRose, Hill) – 12:10
"Give Me the Simple Life" (Rube Bloom, Harry Ruby) – 5:37

Note
The CD reissue includes the bonus track "How Sweet".

Personnel 
 Shirley Scott – organ
 Oliver Nelson – tenor saxophone
 Joe Newman – trumpet
 George Tucker – bass
 Roy Brooks – drums

References 

1966 albums
Albums produced by Esmond Edwards
Albums recorded at Van Gelder Studio
Prestige Records albums
Shirley Scott albums